Verda T. "Vitamin" Smith, Jr. (October 30, 1923 – February 14, 2000) was a National Football League (NFL) running back for the Los Angeles Rams from 1949 through 1953.

Smith served in the United States Army and participated in the Battle of Normandy before enrolling at Abilene Christian University where he sprinted, threw javelin and played college football for the Wildcats. In the NFL, Smith was a return specialist. In 1950, he set a record by returning three kicks for touchdowns in a single season. That record would stand until 1967.

References

1923 births
2000 deaths
United States Army personnel of World War II
American football running backs
American football return specialists
Abilene Christian Wildcats football players
Los Angeles Rams players
People from Lake Dallas, Texas
People from Sweetwater, Texas
Players of American football from Texas